The 1915 Eastern Suburbs DRLFC season was the 8th in the club's history. They competed in the NSWRFL's 1915 Premiership, finishing the season 5th (out of 8).

Details

Results
 Premiership Round 1. Saturday 8 May 1915,
Eastern Suburbs 25 defeated Annandale 3 at the Agricultural Ground.

 Premiership Round 2, Saturday 15 May 1915,
Eastern Suburbs 23 defeated North Sydney 6( E Taplin, S McFarlane Tries) at North Sydney Oval.

 Premiership Round 3, Saturday 22 May 1915,
Balmain 14 defeated Eastern Suburbs 7 at Sydney Cricket Ground.

 Premiership Round 4, Saturday 29 May 1915,
Newtown 5 defeated Eastern Suburbs 3 at the Sydney Cricket Ground.

 Premiership Round 5, Saturday 12 June 1915,
Eastern Suburbs 6 defeated Western Suburbs 3 at St Luke's Park.

 Premiership Round 6, Saturday 19 June 1915
South Sydney 10(Rex Norman, Thompson Tries; H Horder 2 Goals), defeated Eastern Suburbs 7 at the Agricultural Ground.

 Premiership Round 7, Saturday 26 June 1915
Glebe 15 defeated Eastern Suburbs  7 at Wentworth Park.

 Premiership Round 8, Saturday 3 July 1915,
Eastern Suburbs 32 defeated Annandale 3 at Hampden.

 Premiership Round 9, Saturday 10 July 1915
Eastern Suburbs Eastern Suburbs 35 defeated North Sydney 4(R. Farnell, H. Stewart Goals) at Hampden.

 Premiership Round 10, ??? 15 July 1915
Balmain 14 defeated Eastern Suburbs Eastern Suburbs 7 at the Agricultural Ground.

 Premiership Round 11, ??? 31 July 1915
Newtown 9( 3 Tries)  defeated Eastern Suburbs Eastern Suburbs 8(2 Tries; 1 Goal)  at Wentworth Park.

 Premiership Round 12, ??? 7 August 1915,
Eastern Suburbs 12 (2 Tries; 3 Goals) defeated Western Suburbs 5(1 Try; 1 Goal) at Hampden.

 Premiership Round 13, Saturday 14 August 1915,
South Sydney 5( Groves Try; H. Horder Goal) defeated Eastern Suburbs 3 at Agricultural Ground.

 Premiership Round 14, Saturday 21 August 1915,
Glebe 13 defeated Eastern Suburbs 5 at Hampden.

Ladder

City Cup Final

City Cup

Season Highlights
 Won City Cup
 Won Presidents Cup
 Representatives:- Les Cubitt(NSW), George Challis(NSW), Jack Watkins(NSW).

References

External links
Rugby League Tables and Statistics

Sydney Roosters seasons
East